Medford is an unincorporated community in Delaware County, Indiana. It's located about 5 miles to the southeast of Muncie.

History
The post office in Medford was once called Phillips. The Phillips post office operated from 1903 until 1908. One source speculates Medford is named after Medford, Maine.

References

Unincorporated communities in Delaware County, Indiana
Unincorporated communities in Indiana